Rafael Felipe Scheidt (born February 10, 1976, in Porto Alegre, Brazil) is a retired Brazilian footballer. He was signed by Kenny Dalglish, manager of Celtic from Grêmio for £5 million and failed to make an impact. Plagued by injury and finding it hard to settle he started one game in the 1999–00 season against St Johnstone and was let out on loan to Corinthians by new manager Martin O'Neill after just five appearances. Indeed, Scheidt later admitted that following an unimpressive showing in a pre-season friendly O'Neill had told him  "I like footballers who are not like you", further adding "I like footballers who play well." The Guardian newspaper called Scheidt the second worst transfer in the history of soccer, behind Steve Daley, in an article published in 2001.

Scheidt's loan spell at Corinthians came to an end in 2002, and he maintained his hope of making it at Celtic, informing the Sunday Herald that "I want this year to be known as the Scheidt year".  However, he no longer met UK work permit requirements and Celtic paid off the remainder of his contract. He then returned to Brazil, joining Atlético Mineiro.  A year later he signed for Botafogo, before being released by them in 2006.

Scheidt won three caps for Brazil in 1999 shortly prior to his transfer to Celtic.  These games were friendlies and rumours later surfaced that Brazilian based players at that time were being handed caps in return for sweeteners from their clubs wanting to sell them to European clubs for large transfer fees.

Footnotes

External links
 

Living people
Brazilian footballers
Brazilian expatriate footballers
Grêmio Foot-Ball Porto Alegrense players
Kawasaki Frontale players
Celtic F.C. players
Sport Club Corinthians Paulista players
Clube Atlético Mineiro players
Botafogo Futebol Clube (SP) players
Brazil international footballers
Expatriate footballers in Japan
Expatriate footballers in Scotland
Campeonato Brasileiro Série A players
Scottish Premier League players
Brazilian expatriate sportspeople in China
Brazilian people of German descent
1976 births
Expatriate footballers in China
Beijing Renhe F.C. players
Chinese Super League players
Association football defenders
Footballers from Porto Alegre